Fred R. Gowans (born 1936) Fred Gowans is a Professor Emeritus at Brigham Young University (BYU) in Provo, Utah. Dr. Gowans specializes in the fur trade in the American West.  He has written several books on subjects such as Fort Bridger and the Rocky Mountain Rendezvous. He has written a plethora of manuscripts, and articles researching the fur trade, mountain men, and rendezvous system for over forty years, making him the pre-eminent expert on fur trade history.  Dr. Gowans has presented special programs and historical treks to numerous universities, educational institutions, and the National Park Service throughout the West. Dr. Gowans has served as a consultant on numerous films and documentaries about the history of the West, and has been accorded several prestigious awards in film and academia. From 1973-2001 Gowans was the Native American studies coordinator at BYU.

Gowans was also involved in compiling BYU's overland trails database.

References

Sources
Open Library listing
listing of books related to the American West
Trails of Hope database

1936 births
Brigham Young University alumni
Living people